The Countess of Castiglione (Italian: La contessa Castiglione) is a 1942 Italian historical film directed by Flavio Calzavara and starring Doris Duranti, Andrea Checchi and Renato Cialente. The film portrays the life of the nineteenth-century Italian aristocrat Virginia Oldoini, Countess of Castiglione, best known as the lover of Napoleon III of France.

Cast
Doris Duranti as Virginia Oldoini, Countess of Castiglione
Andrea Checchi as Baldo Princivalli
Renato Cialente as Costantino Nigra
Enzo Biliotti as Napoleon III
Lamberto Picasso as marchese Oldoini
Clara Auteri Pepe as Martina
 Annibale Betrone as L'urbanista barone Haussmann
 Giacomo Moschini as Mocquart  
 Cesare Barbetti as Il piccolo Peruzzi
 Marisa Dianora as Marianna 
 Claudio Ermelli as Il nobile sulla sedia a rotelle  
 Nino Marchesini as Connot 
 Alfredo Martinelli as Un amico degli Oldoini 
 Armando Migliari as Un amico degli Oldoini 
 Nico Pepe as Un amico degli Oldoini 
 Emilio Petacci as Un amico degli Oldoini  
 Vinicio Sofia as Un amico degli Oldoini  
 Maria Pia Spini as L'imperatrice Eugenia
Gabriele Ferzetti
 Fulvio Ranieri 
 Ennio Sammartino
 Ambretta Glori  
 Edoardo Grandi
 Alda Lauri
 Alessandra Adari
 Luigi Allodoli

See also 
 The Contessa's Secret (1954)

References

External links

1942 films
1940s historical drama films
1940s Italian-language films
Italian historical drama films
1940s biographical drama films
Italian biographical drama films
Films set in France
Films set in the 19th century
Films directed by Flavio Calzavara
Italian black-and-white films
Cultural depictions of Napoleon III
1942 drama films
Films shot at Cinecittà Studios
Cultural depictions of Italian women
1940s Italian films